James Crow may be the name of:

 James C. Crow (fl. 19th century) (1789–1856), Scottish creator of the sour mash process for making Bourbon Whiskey
 James F. Crow (1916–2012), American genetics professor

See also
 Jim Crow (disambiguation)
 James Crowe (disambiguation)